Birger Braadland (26 January 1879 in Idd, Norway – 15 January 1966 in Idd, Norway) was a Norwegian politician for the Agrarian Party. He served as foreign minister from 1931 to 1933.

Life
He started his career as a professional officer, but retired from the army in 1919 to become a forester. He was Minister for Foreign Affairs for the Kolstad cabinet of 1931-1932 and the Hundseid cabinet of 1932–1933. Towards the end of the Kolstad cabinet, he was briefly also acting prime minister in 1932. Though his tenure was brief, he was forced to deal with a dispute with Denmark over Greenland. He was also a marked opponent of fellow cabinet member Vidkun Quisling.

After the fall of the government, Braadland became a member of the Norwegian parliament. He sat for Østfold from 1934 to 1936, and as deputy representative from 1937 to 1945. He also served on the Norwegian Nobel Committee from 1938 to 1948. His son Erik Braadland later became a member of Parliament.

References

1879 births
1966 deaths
Government ministers of Norway
Foreign Ministers of Norway
Members of the Storting
Centre Party (Norway) politicians
People from Halden